is a Japanese multimedia franchise based on futsal. An anime television series by Diomedéa aired from January to March 2022, and a mobile video game developed by Bandai Namco Entertainment was also released.

Characters

Media

Anime
The project was first revealed on October 4, 2019, with Diomedéa to produce the animation. In February 2021, it was revealed that the anime series would premiere in 2021. However, the anime was delayed to 2022. The delay announcement also confirmed the anime would be a television series. The series is directed by Yukina Hiiro, with scripts by Shōji Yonemura, character designs by Tomomi Ishikawa, and music by R・O・N. It aired from January 9 to March 27, 2022, on Tokyo MX, BS11, and MBS. Takao Sakuma performed the opening theme song "Bravemaker," while STEREO DIVE FOUNDATION performed the ending theme song "Pianissimo". Funimation licensed the series outside of Asia.  A 5-episode short anime will be bundled with the series' sixth Blu-ray/DVD volume on September 28, 2022.

Episode list

Video game
A video game for iOS and Android developed by Bandai Namco Entertainment, titled Futsal Boys!!!!! High-Five League, was announced alongside the anime series. It was originally set to release in 2021, but was later delayed in order to improve the quality of the game.

Notes

References

External links
  
 

2022 anime television series debuts
Android (operating system) games
Association football in anime and manga
Association football video games
Bandai Namco franchises
Diomedéa
Funimation
Futsal
IOS games
Mass media franchises
Mass media franchises introduced in 2022
Tokyo MX original programming
Video games developed in Japan